Dominik Bokk (born 3 February 2000) is a German professional ice hockey forward currently playing for Löwen Frankfurt in the DEL, on loan as a prospect for the Carolina Hurricanes of the National Hockey League (NHL). A top prospect going into the 2018 NHL Entry Draft, Bokk was selected 25th overall by the St. Louis Blues. He did not end up playing with them, as he was traded to the Hurricanes the following year.

Internationally, he has played for the German national team at the 2017 World U18 Championship and the 2018 World Junior Championship, both at the Division I level.

Playing career
Bokk spent time in Germany with the Kölner Haie junior program before moving to Sweden and the Växjö Lakers in 2017. In 2017 he was selected ninth overall  by the Prince Albert Raiders in the 2017 CHL Import Draft. Only interested in playing for a team in the Ontario Hockey League, specifically the Windsor Spitfires, Bokk decided against moving to North America and spent the 2017–18 season in the J20 SuperElit, the top junior league in Sweden, finishing with 41 point in 35 games on Växjö's junior affiliate. He also played 15 games for the senior team in the Swedish Hockey League, scoring one goal and one assist.

Regarded as a top draft pick in the 2018 NHL Entry Draft, Bokk was ranked the twelfth-best European skater by the NHL's Central Scouting Bureau. Bokk was selected by the St. Louis Blues 25th overall. He was then signed to a three-year, entry-level contract with the Blues on 12 July 2018.

On 7 May 2019, after two seasons with the Växjö Lakers, Bokk signed on loan from the St. Louis Blues with fellow SHL club Rögle BK for the 2019–20 season, reuniting with former junior coach Cam Abbott. On 24 September 2019, Bokk was traded, along with Joel Edmundson and a seventh-round pick in 2021, to the Carolina Hurricanes in exchange for Justin Faulk and a fifth-round pick in 2020.

Ending his stint in Sweden, with the Hurricanes and North American seasons set to be delayed due to the COVID-19 pandemic, Bokk remained in Germany loaned by Carolina to join Krefeld Pinguine of the Deutsche Eishockey Liga (DEL) on 12 September 2020. With the league commencement delayed due to the ongoing pandemic, Bokk returned to Sweden and the SHL, agreeing to a loan in joining Djurgårdens IF on 16 October 2020. Bokk made 20 appearances with Djurgårdens in the 2020–21 season, collecting just 3 points, before he was re-assigned by the Hurricanes to join primary AHL affiliate, the Chicago Wolves, on 16 January 2021.

In the following 2021–22 season, Bokk remained in North America, assigned by the Hurricanes to continue with the Chicago Wolves. Through 32 regular season games, Bokk compiled 3 goals and 10 points before he was returned by the Hurricanes to continue his development in Germany on loan for the remainder of the season with Eisbären Berlin of the DEL on 24 February 2022. He made 14 appearances to close out the regular season with Eisbären Berlin, 'collecting 11 points. In the playoffs, Bokk contributed with 2 goals through 12 post-season games to help Eisbären Berlin claim the championship.

Approaching the final season of his entry-level contract, Bokk agreed to remain in Germany, joining second tier club, Löwen Frankfurt of the DEL2, on loan from the Hurricanes on 13 July 2022.

International play
Bokk played for Germany in the 2017 IIHF World U18 Championship Division I where he finished tied for second in scoring with seven goals and three assists. He also played at the 2018 and 2019 World Junior Championships Division IA. At the 2019 tournament he led Division IA in scoring and helped Germany earn promotion to the 2020 World Junior Championships.

Career statistics

Regular season and playoffs

International

References

External links
 

2000 births
Living people
Chicago Wolves players
Djurgårdens IF Hockey players
Eisbären Berlin players
German expatriate sportspeople in Sweden
German ice hockey forwards
Löwen Frankfurt players
National Hockey League first-round draft picks
People from Schweinfurt
Sportspeople from Lower Franconia
Rögle BK players
St. Louis Blues draft picks
Växjö Lakers players